Not Without Hope is a 2010 non-fiction book by Nick Schuyler and Jeré Longman. The book describes a 2009 boating accident in which Schuyler was the sole survivor; his three friends, including NFL players Marquis Cooper and Corey Smith, died in the accident. Not Without Hope was a New York Times best-seller.

Description 
Not Without Hope describes a 2009 boating accident that took the lives of NFL players Marquis Cooper and Corey Smith and Schuyler's best friend Will Bleakley. Co-author Schuyler survived the incident.

On Saturday, February 28, 2009, at about 6:30 AM, the four men embarked in a 21-foot single-engine boat owned by Cooper from the Seminole Boat Ramp near Clearwater Pass. At around 5:30 PM, they went to pull up the anchor and head back to port, but the anchor was stuck. When Cooper tried to thrust the boat forward in an attempt to dislodge the anchor, the vessel became submerged and capsized, tossing the men overboard. According to Schuyler, over the next several hours, his three companions each eventually succumbed to hypothermia. Schuyler was the sole survivor. On March 2, 2009, he was found by the United States Coast Guard. Schuyler was near death, clinging to the engine mount of the capsized vessel.

Accident victims 
 William Ward Bleakley (born November 20, 1983, in Crystal River, Florida) was 25 years old at the time of the incident. He graduated from Crystal River High School with honors, where he played varsity football, baseball, and soccer. Bleakley earned a bachelor's degree from the University of South Florida (USF) in finance and accounting. At the beginning of his college career, he was invited to walk-on to the USF Bulls football team. He played in USF's first two bowl games, including its first bowl victory. Bleakley and Schuyler met in the sixth grade, played football together at USF, and became best friends. In the early morning of March 2, 2009, according to Schuyler, Bleakley became non-responsive, exhibited signs of hypothermia, and separated from the fishing boat.  This was less than six hours before Schuyler himself was rescued by the United States Coast Guard. Bleakley's body was lost at sea; he is missing and presumed dead.
 Marquis Victor Cooper (born March 11, 1982, in Mesa, Arizona) was age 26 when the boating accident occurred.  He was a linebacker in the National Football League. He was drafted by the Tampa Bay Buccaneers in the third round of the 2004 NFL Draft. Cooper had also played for the Minnesota Vikings, Pittsburgh Steelers, Seattle Seahawks, Jacksonville Jaguars, and Oakland Raiders. He played college football at the University of Washington.  Cooper was the owner of the 21-foot single-engine boat on which the four men had gone fishing and which eventually capsized.  In the early morning of March 1, 2009, according to Schuyler, Cooper became non-responsive, exhibited signs of hypothermia, and separated from the fishing boat. According to Schuyler, this occurred approximately one hour before Smith had done the same, and approximately a full day before Bleakley did likewise. Cooper's body was lost at sea; he is missing and presumed dead.
 Nicholas L. ("Nick") Schuyler (born January 18, 1985, in Chardon, Ohio) was 24 years old at the time of the incident. In 2003, he graduated from Chardon High School, where he played on the school's basketball and football teams. He then graduated from the University of South Florida (USF) in 2008 with a degree in communications. At USF, he played on the football team as a walk-on, along with his best friend Bleakley, whom he had known since sixth grade. Schuyler worked as a personal trainer and, in 2014, opened up his own gym in Lutz, Florida. On November 14, 2015, Schuyler married Paula Oliveira. Their son was born in 2017. The sole survivor among the four men, Schuyler was stranded for 46 hours in the 60-degree waters. When rescued by the United States Coast Guard, he was within five to ten hours of death. He was nearly dead from exposure; at the time of his rescue, his body temperature had dropped to 88.8 degrees.
 Corey Dominique Smith (born October 2, 1979, in Richmond, Virginia) was age 29 when he was lost at sea. Smith was an American football defensive end in the National Football League (NFL). He was originally signed by the Tampa Bay Buccaneers as an undrafted free agent in 2002. He had also played for the San Francisco 49ers and the Detroit Lions. Smith played college football at North Carolina State. According to Schuyler, after the boat capsized, Smith began to experience symptoms of hypothermia; he also became increasingly combative. Smith was the first of the men to become separated from the fishing boat. His body was lost at sea; he is missing and presumed dead. Smith's family has established the Corey D. Smith Memorial Scholarship Fund in his honor. The Detroit Lions held a memorial service for him on March 21, 2009. The Detroit Lions announced that they would retire Smith's jersey number (#93) during the 2009 season in honor of him. Smith was (posthumously) named the 2009 recipient of the Detroit Lions/Detroit Sports Broadcasters Association/Pro Football Writers Association's Media-Friendly "Good Guy" Award. The award is given yearly to the Detroit Lions player who shows consideration to, and cooperation with, the media at all times during the course of the season. Smith's family accepted the award on his behalf.

Co-author Jeré Longman 
Having had no experience as an author, Schuyler asked Jeré Longman to co-author Not Without Hope with him.

Jeré Longman (born July 17, 1954, in Coronado, California) grew up in Eunice, Louisiana. He received his bachelor's degree in journalism from Louisiana State University in 1976.

Longman has been a sports reporter for The New York Times since 1993, covering a variety of international sports, primarily the Olympic Games. Prior to working at The New York Times, Longman covered the Philadelphia Eagles and the Philadelphia 76ers for The Philadelphia Inquirer from 1982 to 1993. He also worked as a general assignment sportswriter for the paper. From 1977 to 1982, Longman served as a general assignment reporter and sports writer as well as a school district beat reporter at the Dallas Times Herald. In addition, he wrote about high school and college sports at The Clarion-Ledger in Jackson, Mississippi, from 1976 to 1977.

In 2009, Longman and his colleague Juliet Macur were awarded first place in the Associated Press Sports Editors (APSE) Breaking News Category for their report raising questions about the ages of the Chinese gymnasts at the 2008 Summer Olympics.

Longman is the author of The Girls of Summer (2000), a book about the United States soccer team that won the 1999 Women's World Cup. He also wrote Among the Heroes (2002), a book about United Airlines Flight 93 that was hijacked during the September 11 attacks and crashed in Pennsylvania after the passengers and crew rebelled against the hijackers. Among the Heroes became a New York Times bestseller. In addition, Longman authored The Hurricanes (2008), about a high school football team in Plaquemines Parish, Louisiana, struggling to be reborn in the aftermath of Hurricane Katrina. The Hurricanes was chosen by Slate magazine as one of the Best Books of 2008.

Official report of accident 
On March 25, 2009, a report was released based on a Florida Fish and Wildlife Conservation Commission investigation into the capsizing; the investigation included interviews with Schuyler (the survivor) and an inspection of the boat.

The report concluded the following:

 the anchor line was tied to the port-side transom as part of a (mistaken) plan to free the anchor;
 the vessel, which had a  motor, was then throttled forward;
 the rear of the vessel was pulled into the water because the vessel's motor had been throttled without enough slack in the anchor line; and
 the capsizing ejected the operator and occupants into rough Gulf waters.

The conclusions were accompanied by additional details from the Schuyler interviews. According to Schuyler, after the capsizing, he and the other three men, all wearing flotation devices, struggled overnight to remain on top of the capsized hull of the boat, with water reaching chest-high over the partially submerged hull and waves of approximately 6 feet. Cooper and Smith became non-responsive and separated from the vessel between 5:30 AM and 6:30 AM on the morning of March 1, and Bleakley became non-responsive and separated about 24 hours later, which was less than six hours before Schuyler was rescued. The investigator described the symptoms Schuyler witnessed as characteristic of hypothermia.

The New York Times Best Seller list 
Not Without Hope appeared on The New York Times Best Seller list.

Television 
Shuyler's story was the subject of an HBO Real Sports with Bryant Gumbel segment and a one-hour Oprah Winfrey special.

Film 
Not Without Hope is slated to be made into a film. The film was originally to be produced, distributed, and financed by Relativity Media. Dwayne Johnson was cast to play Schuyler and was also executive producer. After the project was tied up at Relativity Media for four years, as a result of the company's 2015 bankruptcy, 36films and its founder Michael Cuccolo acquired the rights to produce the survival drama. The UK production/financing company Goldfinch later purchased the film rights and hired Rupert Wainwright as director. Miles Teller was cast in the role of Schuyler, and production was set to begin in early 2020. With the outbreak of coronavirus delaying film production, the filming date was moved to September, with pre-production beginning at the water facility in Pinewood Dominican Republic Studios. However, Wainwright would later leave the director's chair, citing creative differences, before filming began.

See also 
 2010 in literature
 Memoir
 Survivor guilt, to which Schuyler admits suffering

References

Further reading 
 Nick Schuyler writes 'Not Without Hope,' his detailed account of the boating accident that killed three other men, including NFL players Marquis Cooper and Cory Smith
 Nick Schuyler's Survival Story
 Report: Improper anchoring caused boat accident
 Soon to be a Motion Picture: From CEO to Film Producer
 Lessons from a tragedy

External links 
 
 
 
 Records Say Chinese Gymnasts May Be Under Age by Jeré Longman and Juliet Macur, The New York Times, July 27, 2008  award-winning story about the 2008 Olympics scandal

2010 non-fiction books
American memoirs
Boating accident deaths
Maritime incidents in 2009
People lost at sea
William Morrow and Company books